The 2017 Taça de Macau is the 2017 cup season competition of Taça de Macau.

Round of 16

|}

Quarter-finals

|}

Semi-finals

|}

Third place match

|}

Final

|}

See also
2017 Liga de Elite

References

External links
Macau Football Association 

2
Macau